Sajith is a masculine given name of Sinhalese origin. Notable people with the name include:

Sajith Dissanayaka (born 1989), Sri Lankan cricketer
Sajith Fernando (born 1972), Sri Lankan first-class cricketer
Sajith Jagadnandan (born 1981), Indian film director of movies in Malayalam
Sajith Premadasa (born 1967) Sri Lankan politician, since 2020 Leader of the Opposition
Sajith de Silva (born 1998), Sri Lankan cricketer

Sinhalese masculine given names